Events from the year 1872 in Ireland.

Events
Party Processions Acts repealed.
Summer – about 30,000 Nationalists hold a demonstration at Hannahstown near Belfast, campaigning for the release of Fenian prisoners, but leading to another series of riots between Catholics and Protestants in the city.
23 November – 1872 Londonderry City by-election, the first Irish election to the Parliament of the UK held by secret ballot. The seat is won from the Liberal Party by the Irish Conservative Party's Charles Lewis.
Ulster Hospital for Women and Sick Children is opened in Chichester Street, Belfast.

Arts and literature
Samuel Ferguson publishes his long poem Congal.
Sheridan Le Fanu publishes his short-story collection In a Glass Darkly including the vampire novella Carmilla.
Charles Lever publishes his last novel Lord Kilgobbin, "a tale of Ireland in our own time" (serialisation concludes and publication in book form).

Sport

Births
14 February – Tom Ross, cricketer (died 1947).
31 March – Arthur Griffith, founder and third leader of Sinn Féin, served as President of Dáil Éireann (died 1922).
26 April – William Cunningham Deane-Tanner, later William Desmond Taylor, film director in United States (murdered 1922).
13 June – Blayney Hamilton, cricketer (died 1946).
4/7 July – John J. O'Kelly, politician, author and publisher, president of the Gaelic League and Sinn Féin (died 1957).
16 July – George Henry Morris, soldier, first commanding officer to lead an Irish Guards battalion into battle (killed in action 1914).
23 July – John J. McGrath, Democrat U.S. Representative from California (died 1951).
13 August – Robert Johnston, soldier, recipient of the Victoria Cross for gallantry in 1899 at the Battle of Elandslaagte, South Africa (died 1950).
4 September – James Magee, cricketer (died 1949).
23 September – Dan Comyn, cricketer (died 1949).
20 October – Seán O'Mahony, Sinn Féin MP (died 1934).
24 October – Peter O'Connor, athlete (born in Millom, England) (died 1957)
13 November – John M. Lyle, architect in Canada (died 1945).
28 November – Ethel Hobday, pianist (died 1947).
Undated – Patrick R. Chalmers, writer (died 1942).

Deaths
22 January – Valentine McMaster, Scottish military surgeon, recipient of the Victoria Cross for gallantry in 1857 at the Siege of Lucknow, India (born 1834 in British India).
8 February – Richard Bourke, 6th Earl of Mayo, statesman, three times Chief Secretary for Ireland, Viceroy of India, assassinated (born 1822).
1 June – Charles Lever, novelist (born 1806).
18 October – Michael O'Connor, first Catholic Bishop of Pittsburgh, Pennsylvania, first Catholic Bishop of Erie, Jesuit (born 1810).
23 November – Joseph Ward, recipient of the Victoria Cross for gallantry in 1858 at Gwalior, India (born 1832).
6 December – James Byrne, recipient of the Victoria Cross (born 1822).
Full date unknown
Anne Elizabeth Ball, phycologist (born 1808).
Robert Patterson, businessman and naturalist (born 1802).

References

 
1870s in Ireland
Ireland
Years of the 19th century in Ireland
 Ireland